Anthony Rigoberto Landázuri Estacio (born 19 April 1997) is an Ecuadorian footballer who plays as right back for Ecuadorian Serie A club Independiente del Valle.

Club career

Independiente del Valle
Born in Esmeraldas, Landázuri joined Independiente del Valle's youth setup in 2011, from Norte América. He made his first team debut on 28 November 2015, starting in a 3–3 Serie A home draw against Barcelona SC.

Landázuri scored his first senior goal on 13 December 2015, netting his team's second in a 3–4 away loss against LDU Quito. After being a backup option, he started to feature more regularly from the 2019 season onwards.

Fortaleza
On 14 December 2021, Landázuri moved abroad and signed a two-year contract with Campeonato Brasileiro Série A side Fortaleza. After only one year playing for the Brazilian club, on 15 December 2022, Landázuri asked for a contract termination.

Independiente del Valle second stint
Right after leaving Fortaleza Landázuri returned to his former club Ecuadorian club Independiente del Valle signing a two-year contract.

Career statistics

Honours
Independiente del Valle
Copa Sudamericana: 2019
Ecuadorian Serie A: 2021

Fortaleza
Copa do Nordeste: 2022
Campeonato Cearense: 2022

References

1997 births
Living people
People from Esmeraldas, Ecuador
Ecuadorian footballers
Association football defenders
Ecuadorian Serie A players
Campeonato Brasileiro Série A players
C.S.D. Independiente del Valle footballers
Fortaleza Esporte Clube players
Ecuadorian expatriate footballers
Ecuadorian expatriate sportspeople in Brazil
Expatriate footballers in Brazil
C.S. Norte América footballers